The Sherman Avenue Historic District is a historic district in central Madison, Wisconsin, United States, that is listed on the National Register of Historic Places (NRHP).

Description
As its name indicates, the district runs along Sherman Avenue, beginning at Brearly Street on the southwest (a cross street which is also the southern end of Sherman Avenue) running northeast to Marston Avenue (which runs southeast from Sherman Avenue). Located within the district is the Louis Hirsig House, a historic residence that is also listed individually on the NRHP.

The district was listed on the NRHP March 22, 1988 and on the State Register of Historic Places the following year.

See also

 National Register of Historic Places listings in Madison, Wisconsin

References

External links

Historic districts on the National Register of Historic Places in Wisconsin
National Register of Historic Places in Madison, Wisconsin